West Liberty Courthouse Square Historic District is a national historic district located at Liberty, Clay County, Missouri.  It encompasses three contributing buildings in the central business district of Liberty. The adjoining buildings were built between 1877 and 1885, and are representative examples of Italianate style commercial architecture.

It was listed on the National Register of Historic Places in 1992.

References

Historic districts on the National Register of Historic Places in Missouri
Italianate architecture in Missouri
Buildings and structures in Clay County, Missouri
National Register of Historic Places in Clay County, Missouri
Liberty, Missouri